P'aqla Urqu (Quechua p'aqla bald, urqu mountain, "bald mountain",  also spelled Phajla Orkho) is a  mountain in the Bolivian Andes. It is located in the Chuquisaca Department, Oropeza Province, Yotala Municipality. P'aqla Urqu lies at the Panti Mayu which is a left tributary of the  Pillku Mayu (Quechua for "red river").

References 

Mountains of Chuquisaca Department